The Miss Perú 1986 pageant was held on May 3, 1986. That year, 22 candidates were competing for the national crown. The chosen winner represented Peru at the Miss Universe 1986. The rest of the finalists would enter in different pageants.

Placements

Special Awards

 Best Regional Costume - Cuzco - Johana Farfán
 Miss Photogenic - Lambayeque - Milagros Boggiano Laca
 Miss Elegance - Cuzco - Johana Farfán
 Miss Body - Amazonas - Asunta Ramos
 Best Hair - Ucayali - Edith Tapia
 Miss Congeniality - Piura - Karin Lindermann
 Most Beautiful Face - Lambayeque - Milagros Boggiano Laca

.

Delegates

Amazonas - Asunta Ramos Tenorio
Áncash - Cecilia Vidarte
Arequipa - Diana Zecevich
Camaná - María Amelia Carozzi
Carabayllo - Valeria Pulgar Dextre
Castilla - Patricia Lizarraga
Chancay - Rosa María Fortunic
Cuzco - Johana Farfán
Distrito Capital - Roxana Matute
La Libertad - Janet Botton
La Molina - Vilma Torres

La Union - Francis Sánchez Mendoza
Lambayeque - Milagros Boggiano Laca
Mollendo - Andrea Garces Villanueva
Piura - Karin Lindermann
Region Arequipa - Danitza Salas
San Isidro - Janet Ylbert
Surco - Patricia Kuypers
Tacna - María Dolores Martínez
Tumbes - Brenda Lindao
Ucayali - Edith Tapia
USA Peru - Catherine Garate

Judges

 Luis Llosa Urquidi - Peruvian Movie Director
 Cusi Barrio - Peruvian TV series Director
 Robert Vaughn - American Actor
 Carlos Morales Andrade - Regional Manager of Aeroperu
 Nelly DeSamane - Designer at Boutique Jessica
 Eduardo Bonilla - Manager of Creaciones Sheila
 Teresa Ricketts - Miss Arequipa 1964
 Alfonso Pait - Manager of Beauty Form
 Liliana Valderrama - Manager of Paraiso
 José Antonio Caro - Owner Hotel José Antonio of Miraflores
 Eduardo Eguiluz Solari - President of Club de Leones of Arequipa
 Carlos García Bragagnini - Manager of Representaciones García Arequipa
 Clarita Santa Cruz - Sales Manager of Panamericana Televisión
 Fernando Herrera - Regional Manager of Panamericana Televisión

.

Background Music

Swimsuit Competition – Spyro Gyra — "Incognito"
Evening Gown Competition - Spyro Gyra — "Sueño"

.

References 

Miss Peru
1986 in Peru
1986 beauty pageants